Infernal Overdrive is the fourth studio album by heavy metal band White Wizzard, released on January 12, 2018. It was the last album released by the band before they temporarily disbanded on April 24, 2018.

Reception 
The album was well received, with critics calling it an improvement over the band's previous release, The Devil's Cut, which many felt was rushed. Metal Nation claimed that the album was the band's "best album to date", while Iron Skullet praised the album's performances and production quality. However, some critics felt that the album was rushed, and would have benefited from further editing and production.

Track listing

Personnel 
 Jon Leon – bass, guitars, synths, bouzouki
 James J. LaRue – guitars (lead), synths, orchestration
 Wyatt Anderson – vocals
 Dylan Marks – drums

References 

White Wizzard albums
Heavy metal albums by American artists
2018 albums